Charles Barton (1768–1843) was an English legal writer. He was called to the bar at the Inner Temple in 1795, and practised as a conveyancer. He died at Cheltenham on 18 November 1843, aged 75.

Works
His principal publications are: 
 'Historical Treatise of a Suit in Equity,' 1796. 
 'Elements of Conveyancing,' 6 vols., 1802–5, 2nd ed. 1821–2. 
 'Original Precedents in Conveyancing.' 5 vols., 1807–10. 
 'Practical Dissertations on Conveyancing,' 1828.

References

Attribution

1768 births
1843 deaths
Legal writers
18th-century English people
18th-century English writers
18th-century English male writers
19th-century English writers